Pat Critchley is a sportsman from County Laois, Ireland. He has played at senior level in hurling, football and handball. He is a member of Portlaoise GAA club, with whom he won eight Laois Senior county championships - four each in hurling and football. He guided IT Carlow to the Sigerson cup final 2020.

Playing career
Critchley has won one Leinster and one All-Ireland club football championship with Portlaoise. Critchley also won one Limerick county Football championship.

He was awarded Laois's sole hurling All Stars Award in 1985.

Coaching career
Critchley has coached Scoil Chriost Ri, Portlaoise basketball teams to eleven All-Ireland finals, winning five, and led the school to an All-Ireland football title.

Critchley occupies a full-time coaching and development role with the Laois GAA County Board and is the instigator of the successful Setanta Hurling program and the follow on Cuchulainn program.

Personal life
Pat was a physical education teacher at Scoil Chriost Ri, Portlaoise. His autobiography is called Hungry Hill.

References

Year of birth missing (living people)
Living people
Dual players
Gaelic football coaches
Hurling coaches
Laois GAA
Laois inter-county hurlers
Portlaoise Gaelic footballers
Portlaoise hurlers